Basil Glen Ballard Jr. (born May 1, 1953) is an American songwriter, lyricist, and record producer. He is best known for co-writing and producing Alanis Morissette's 1995 album Jagged Little Pill, which won Grammy Awards for Best Rock Album and Album of the Year, and was ranked by Rolling Stone as one of the 500 Greatest Albums of All Time. He is also well known for his collaborations with composer Alan Silvestri. He was involved in the recording and writing of Michael Jackson's albums Thriller, Bad and Dangerous. As a writer, he co-wrote songs including "Man in the Mirror" (1987)  and "Hand in My Pocket" (1995). He is the founder of Java Records. He won the 2006 Grammy Award for Best Song Written for a Motion Picture, Television or Other Visual Media for "Believe" (The Polar Express). 

In 2011, Ballard founded his own production company known as Augury, focused on developing music-driven projects in film, television, and theater. He was involved in the development of the eight-part TV series The Eddy, centering around a jazz club in Paris, which aired on Netflix in May 2020.

Discography
He has performed on or produced the following:
 Michael Jackson — Thriller  (1982)
 Pointer Sisters — Break Out (1983)
 Patti Austin — Patti Austin (1984)
 Evelyn King — So Romantic (1984)
 Jack Wagner — All I Need (1984)
 Jack Wagner — Lighting Up the Night (1985)
 Teddy Pendergrass — Workin' It Back (1985)
 The Pointer Sisters - Hot Together (1986)
 Michael Jackson — Bad (1987)
 Jack Wagner — Don't Give Up Your Day Job (1987)
 Paula Abdul — Forever Your Girl (1988)
 Jon Butcher — Pictures from the Front (1989)
 Paula Abdul — Shut Up and Dance (1990)
 Wilson Phillips — Wilson Phillips (1990)
 Curtis Stigers — Curtis Stigers  (1991)
 Michael Jackson — Dangerous (1991)
 Wilson Phillips — Shadows and Light (1992)
 Trey Lorenz — Trey Lorenz (1992)
 Jack Wagner — Alone in the Crowd (1993)
 K. T. Oslin — Greatest Hits: Songs from an Aging Sex Bomb (1993)
 Lea Salonga — Lea Salonga (1993)
 Evelyn King — Love Come Down: The Best of Evelyn "Champagne" King (1993)
 Alanis Morissette — Jagged Little Pill (1995)
 Sheena Easton — My Cherie (1995)
 Chynna Phillips — Naked And Sacred (1995)
 Toto — Tambu (1995)
 Curtis Stigers — Time Was (1995)
 Van Halen — Best Of – Volume I ("Me Wise Magic" and "Can't Get This Stuff No More") (1996)
 Aerosmith — Nine Lives (1997)
 The Corrs — Talk On Corners (1997)
 Brendan Lynch — Brendan Lynch (1997)
 Alanis Morissette — Supposed Former Infatuation Junkie (1998)
 Block — Timing Is Everything (1998)
 The Moffatts — Chapter I: A New Beginning (1999)
 Lara Fabian — Lara Fabian (2000)
 No Doubt — Return of Saturn (2000)
 Titan A.E. — Music From The Motion Picture (2000)
 Judith Owen — Limited Edition (2000)
 Bliss 66 — Trip to the 13th (2001)
 Shakira — "The One" (2001)
 Dave Matthews Band — Everyday (2001)
 Crashed..... (2001)
 Lit — Atomic (2001)
 Live — "Forever Might Not Be Long Enough" (2001)
 Shelby Lynne — Love, Shelby (2001)
 Terence Trent D'arby — Wildcard (2001)
 Sheila Nicholls — Wake (2002)
 Christina Aguilera — Stripped (2002) (co-wrote "The Voice Within")
 Lisa Marie Presley — To Whom It May Concern (2003)
 Anastacia — Anastacia (2004)
 Elisa — Pearl Days (2004)
 Van Halen — The Best Of Both Worlds (2004)
 Fragile System — Atomic Tiger (2004)
 Katy Perry — Unreleased album, reworked into One of the Boys (2004 - Album shelved)
 Alanis Morissette — Jagged Little Pill Acoustic (2005)
 O.A.R. — Stories of a Stranger (2005)
 Hayley Westenra - The New World Soundtrack (2005)
 Goo Goo Dolls — Let Love In (2006)
 P.O.D. — Testify (2006)
 Annie Lennox — Dark Road (2007)
 Carina Round — Slow Motion Addict (2007)
 Emmy Rossum — Inside Out (2007)
 Annie Lennox — Songs of Mass Destruction (2007)
 Anouk — Who's Your Momma (2007)
 A Hero Comes Home (2007)
 Katy Perry — One of the Boys (2008)
 Idina Menzel — I Stand (2008)
 Anna Vissi — Apagorevmeno (2008)
 Miley Cyrus — Hannah Montana: The Movie (2009)
 Wilson Phillips — Christmas in Harmony (2010)
 Stevie Nicks — In Your Dreams (2011) (produced tracks with David A. Stewart)
 Anastacia — It's a Man's World (2012)
 Ringo Starr — Ringo 2012 (2012)
 SNH48 TOP 16 — 那不勒斯的黎明 (Dawn in Naples) (2017)
 Ringo Starr — Give More Love (2017)
 B*Witched — Hold On (2019)

Film and television
Ballard wrote the screenplay for Clubland, a music-driven film about an aspiring musician in Los Angeles. He has written songs in half a dozen films, including The Slugger's Wife, Navy Seals, The Polar Express, and Batman: Mask of the Phantasm.

Ballard was involved in the development of the TV series The Eddy, broadcast by Netflix in May 2020. Ballard also co-wrote the music for the series and served as an executive producer. He wrote new songs with Alan Silvestri for the 2022 live-action film adaptation of Disney's Pinocchio.

Musical theatre
Ballard co-wrote the music and lyrics for Ghost the Musical with David A. Stewart and Bruce Joel Rubin, which opened in London's West End on July 19, 2011, and opened on Broadway in the spring of 2012.

On January 31, 2014, it was announced that a stage musical of the film Back to the Future was in production. The show, which is being co-written by original writers Robert Zemeckis and Bob Gale, premiered in Manchester, on February 20, 2020. Ballard will team with Alan Silvestri to compose a new score, with the addition of original songs from the film, including "The Power of Love", "Johnny B. Goode" and "Earth Angel".

Further reading
 Glen Ballard songbook. Alfred Publishing Co., Inc., 2000. .

See also
 Albums produced by Glen Ballard
 Songs written by Glen Ballard

References

External links
 Official website
 
 

1953 births
Record producers from Mississippi
Songwriters from Mississippi
American male songwriters
American rock songwriters
Grammy Award winners
Living people
Musicians from Natchez, Mississippi